DataPlay is an optical disc system developed by DataPlay Inc. and released to the consumer market in 2002. Using very small (32mm diameter) disks enclosed in a protective cartridge storing 250MB per side, DataPlay was intended primarily for portable music playback, although it could also store other types of data, using both pre-recorded disks and user-recorded disks (and disks that combined pre-recorded information with a writable area). It would also allow for multisession recording.  It won the CES Best of Show award in 2001. 

DataPlay also included an elaborate digital rights management system designed to allow consumers to "unlock" extra pre-recorded content on the disk at any time, through the internet, following the initial purchase. It was based on the Secure Digital Music Initiative's DRM system. Dataplay's DRM system was one of the reasons behind its attractiveness to the music industry. It also included a proprietary file system, Dataplay File System (DFS) which natively supported DRM. By default it would allow up to 3 copies to other Dataplay discs, without allowing any copies to CDs.

The recorded music industry was initially generally supportive of DataPlay and a small number of a pre-recorded DataPlay disks were released, including the Britney Spears album Britney. Graphics on press releases show that Sting and Garth Brooks were also set to have DataPlay releases. In 2001 the first DIY DataPlay album was released by the experimental rave producer Backmasker. However, as a pre-recorded format, DataPlay was a failure. The company closed due to a lack of funding.  In 2003 a company called DPHI bought Dataplay's intellectual property and reintroduced it at CES 2004. The company swapped Dataplay's DFS file system in favor of the FAT file system. Again, they were marketed as a cheaper alternative to memory cards, with a device being designed that would allow users to transfer data from an SD card to a cheaper and higher capacity Dataplay disc. Each disc would hold 500 megabytes of data and be sold at just US$4.50. DPHI also prototyped 750 megabyte Dataplay discs and announced plans for 2 and 7 gigabyte discs, the latter of which would use a blue-violet semiconductor laser, just like Blu-ray.

There were very few products seen on the market that could write data to these discs.  Most notable was the Topy Mini Writer, which retailed for $130 (USD) and housed an optical pickup unit (image No.4) with a USB interface board, allowing the use of DataPlay discs much like other end-user writable optical media (e.g., CD-Rs).  Other products were the iriver IDP-100 and the MTV Video Device "MTV FLIP", which both housed the prototype-based model (image No.2). 

Dataplay discs were first proposed as a low cost alternative to memory cards, which used to cost US$3 per megabyte. Blank Dataplay discs, by comparison, would hold 500 megabytes of data at US$10 per disc. They are also expected to have a 100-year lifespan.  The discs would be made out of polycarbonate, just like CDs, but would be just 0.6mm thick, just like one half of a DVD. (DVDs are made up of two halves that are bonded using glue; usually only one (side) contains data)Rewritable Dataplay discs would be similar to CDs, using a phase change alloy protected by a Silicon Oxide layer.  Mastered (replicated) Dataplay discs would combine both pits and lands to store mastered data, and grooves containing a wobble frequency to store rewritable data. Just like on CDs, the wobble frequency would store time data, to precisely position the laser on the disc. 

It has two rewritable areas: one for user data, and the other for encrypted data, the latter of which would hold the decryption keys necessary to unlock the extra content. They also have a Burst cutting area to uniquely identify each disc.  Dataplays can transfer data at 1 megabyte per second. 

Other trademark names:
 DaTARIUS
 DPHI
 Dataplay

Gallery

References

External links
 Official Site (defunct)
 Techmoan: DataPlay: The futuristic optical disc format that time forgot, YouTube, 8 November 2018

Digital audio storage
Audiovisual introductions in 2002
Privately held companies based in Colorado
Optical computer storage